The Hotel Zaracay salamander (Bolitoglossa chica) is a species of salamander in the family Plethodontidae.
It is endemic to Ecuador.
Its natural habitat is subtropical or tropical moist lowland forests.
It is threatened by habitat loss.

References

Bolitoglossa
Amphibians of Ecuador
Endemic fauna of Ecuador
Taxonomy articles created by Polbot
Amphibians described in 1963